Jiaganj is a railway station of the Sealdah-Lalgola line in the Eastern Railway zone of Indian Railways. The station is situated at Jiaganj in Murshidabad district in the Indian state of West Bengal. It serves Jiaganj town and surroundings areas. Hazarduari Express, Dhano Dhanye Express, Lalgola Passengers and few EMU trains pass through the station. There is another major railway station,  of Jiaganj Azimganj tween town of the district.

Electrification
The Krishnanagar– Section, including Jiaganj railway station was electrified in 2004. In 2010 the line became double tracked.

References

Railway stations in Murshidabad district
Sealdah railway division
Kolkata Suburban Railway stations